Thomas Leo Tasker (21 October 1900 – 1 June 1948) was an Australian rules footballer who played with Geelong and Carlton in the Victorian Football League (VFL).

Notes

External links 

 
Leo Tasker's profile at Blueseum

1900 births
1948 deaths
Australian rules footballers from Victoria (Australia)
Geelong Football Club players
Carlton Football Club players